Deburau is a 1951 French historical comedy drama film directed by and starring Sacha Guitry alongside Lana Marconi, Robert Seller and Jeanne Fusier-Gir. It is based on Guitry's own 1918 play Deburau, inspired by the life of the eighteenth century mime Jean-Gaspard Deburau. It was shot at the Francoeur Studios in Paris. The film's sets were designed by the art director René Renoux.

Cast
 Sacha Guitry as 	Jean-Gaspard Deburau / Self
 Lana Marconi as 	Marie Duplessis
 Michel François as Charles Deburau fils
 Robert Seller as 	M. Bertrand
 Jeanne Fusier-Gir as 	Mme. Raboin	
 Georges Bever as Laurent 
 Jean Danet as 	Armand Duval
 Claire Brilletti as 	Clara	
 Henri Belly as 	Un journaliste
 Christine Darbel as 	Honorine
 Jacques de Féraudy as 	Le docteur
 Jacques Derives as Laplace
 Albert Duvaleix as 	Robillard
 Luce Fabiole as 	Mme. Rébard
 Françoise Fechter as Justine
 Andrée Guize as 	Une dame
 Yvonne Hébert as 	La caissière
 Henry Laverne as 	L'aboyeur
 Max Morana as 	Ménard

References

Bibliography
 Hayward, Susan. French Costume Drama of the 1950s: Fashioning Politics in Film. Intellect Books, 2010.

External links 
 

1951 films
1950s French-language films
1951 comedy films
Films directed by Sacha Guitry
French films based on plays
Films set in the 1830s
French historical comedy films
1950s historical comedy films
Films set in Paris
Films shot at Francoeur Studios
1950s French films